René Joseph Rakotondrabé (12 September 1932 – 9 July 2012) was the Roman Catholic bishop of the Roman Catholic Diocese of Toamasina, Madagascar.

Biography
Rakotondrabé was born 12 September 1932 in Fandriana and was ordained to the priesthood in 1960. He was named auxiliary Bishop of Toliara and Titular Bishop of Umbriatico in 1972, Bishop of Toliara in 1974, and Bishop of Toamasina in 1989.

He retired in 2008 and died 9 July 2012.

References

21st-century Roman Catholic bishops in Madagascar
1932 births
2012 deaths
20th-century Roman Catholic bishops in Madagascar
Malagasy Roman Catholic bishops
Roman Catholic bishops of Toliara
Roman Catholic bishops of Toamasina